Kelli McMullen-Temple (born 25 October 1960) is a Canadian equestrian. She competed in two events at the 1996 Summer Olympics.

References

External links
 

1960 births
Living people
Canadian female equestrians
Olympic equestrians of Canada
Equestrians at the 1996 Summer Olympics
Sportspeople from Columbus, Ohio